The London Tourist Board was established in 1963 and became the official regional tourist board for London under the Development of Tourism Act in 1969.  It was responsible for the marketing and promotion of the capital, providing tourist information services, and recommending improvements to the infrastructure and facilities for the growth of tourism.  In 2003, it was renamed VisitLondon.  In 2011, it was put into administration by the Greater London Authority, and the tourism responsibility was transferred to a new company, London & Partners.

Introduction

Alongside finance and retailing Tourism in London is one of London's most important industries.  When the London Tourist Board was founded in 1963 a mere 1.6 million overseas visitors came to London, in the year 2010 this had grown to 10 million, plus 16 million from overseas.  The London Tourist Board set up by industry representatives including Sir Charles Forte, later Lord Forte, famous hotelier, with support from the London County Council, played a major role in promoting London, in providing information for visitors, establishing standards and in shaping the tourism product we see today.  Throughout its 40-year history London Tourist Board receive up to 70 per cent of its funding from public sources (Greater London Council, English Tourist Board, London Boroughs and Greater London Authority).

This article explores the history and achievements of the London Tourist Board and the London Visitor and Convention Bureau, leading to the establishment of Visit London in 2003. Visit London took over the marketing of London, while the London Development Agency was responsible for planning, research and development. In 2011, Visit London was put into administration by the Greater London Authority (its main funder) and replaced with a new organisation, London & Partners.

Early history and objectives

The London Tourist Board (LTB) was founded on 16 May 1963 by representatives of the tourist industry led by Sir Charles Forte, later Lord Forte. Its first objectives were:

	To carry out information and reception services for overseas visitors in association with the British Travel Association, later British Tourist Authority and now VisitBritain and (after 1969 and the passing of the Development of Tourism Act) the English Tourist Board [Visit England] – information and accommodation services were the main part of LTB's activities in the early years.
	To develop services and amenities for visitors to London
	To attract visitors to London from all parts of Britain and to extend the London visitor season.
	To encourage the holding of national and international conferences and exhibitions in London through the Convention Bureau set up as department of LTB.
	To consult with and advise the BTA on publicity and promotions to attract visitors to London

An important aim, apart from seasonal spread, has always been to achieve a better geographical spread of tourists through London and latterly, throughout the UK.

Achievements in the early years

LTB played a major role in developing London's appeal to visitors through tourist information – in person and on the phone – providing accommodation booking services, training of tourist guides, developing the product through events, promotions such as London in Bloom, and providing information for conference and exhibition organisers.  Here are some of the highlights:

The provision of information services from the beginning – in person, by mail and telephone. By 1965, LTB were handling 134,000 enquiries a year rising to over 2 million in later years.  There were tourist information centres in Victoria, at Selfridges and Harrods, Tower of London, Liverpool Street station and eventually at Heathrow.
Sourcing student accommodation was a key challenge for LTB's services during the period of 'Swinging London'. LTB set up a student centre at International Student House on June 1970 – 23,116 students housed in the first summer.
The LTB ran a Private Accommodation Bureau from its offices in Piccadilly. In 1969, because of rising demand, LTB appealed for more private home owners to take in visitors – 459 took part and dealt with over 6,000 visitors. Became an established core of inexpensive accommodation. Other initiatives included Tent City at Wormwood Scrubs and a camp site on Hackney Marshes.
Opened a budget accommodation centre in Buckingham Palace Road in 1972 to cope with the growing number of youth visitors.
LTB ran the Teletourist recorded message service from March 1971 in English and 4 other languages – 1.25m users in first year.
The London Convention Bureau publication was issued in 1964 'London –Capital for Conferences and Conventions'. The LCB was recognised as being one of the best of its kind in the world and won many awards.
The LCB Diary was first published in 1971 followed by 'This Month in London' in 1973 – the year that London was the Number 1 city for international association meetings.
The running of the Blue Badge Guide course, the register, examinations etc. from 1970 – the course was rightly recognised as being one of the best in the world.
London Log (a monthly magazine for the industry) was first published in 1965 – a source of information and news about London and LTB.
LTB membership scheme for the industry was launched in May 1970.
From the beginning the river was seen as a significant tourism asset—LTB took the lead in promotions and other activity to improve services for visitors (piers, pooling services, providing accurate data for crews to use etc.)
The organisation of the Easter Parade in Battersea Park and the Easter Bunny and Princess competitions for 11 years until 1973 – up to 1/2 million people attended each year.
The organisation and promotion of Son et Lumiere at Hampton Court (1966 & 1970) and the Tower of London (1967)
The introduction and organisation of the London in Bloom competition from 1967 as part of Britain in Bloom

Early promotions

LTB worked in partnership with the Greater London Council, the London boroughs and others, initiating a series of marketing campaigns aimed at tourists from the UK and overseas.  Here are some of them:

	Joint regional promotions with British Rail (1969/70)
	City for all Seasons (1970/71)
	Great London Fair at Swiss Centre (Jan/Feb 1971)
	Festival of London (1972)
	London Entertains (Feb 1974)
	Enjoy the River Thames (1976)
	Let's Go to London – short breaks campaign ( from 1976)

Borough activity and planning

From 1977, LTB began to take a lead role for the industry in planning matters and working more closely with London boroughs. This was the period when District Plans were being prepared and it was important to ensure that the requirements of the tourist industry were featured. This included making constructive objections to both the Plans from Westminster and Kensington and Chelsea. Prior to this a document 'Tourism in London—a Plan for Management' was published in 1974 by the LTB working with Greater London Council, English Tourist Board and the London Boroughs Association. The key elements were:

	Easing congestion – regional spread
	Better management at key sites
	Quality of accommodation
	Product improvement

Some of the other activities were as follows:

Mini guides — Richmond (1975) and Hounslow (1977) were the first.
Hillingdon Tourist Information Centre (TIC) opened in 1977 – there were 19 TICs across London by May 1989. LTB support included staff training, reference kits and TIC managers meetings.

Richmond set up a tourism association following a presentation and urging by LTB.
Developing ideas and activity with borough such as Islington, Greenwich, Croydon – meetings, site promotion, environmental improvement.

More promotions from 1981

London did not rest on its laurels, a series of major marketing campaigns followed in the 1980s helped by such events as the wedding of Prince Charles and Diana Spencer in July 1981.  LTB's press and information staff set up a London information point at the Royal Wedding official press centre.

	London Is – (1981/2)
	Geordie's London (1982)
	Let's go to London for the weekend (press campaign – an example of many)
	Excursions '78 etc. (annual trade fair for London and adjoining RTBs).
	Presidents Marketing Awards – ran for 8 years in the 1980s (sponsored by the LTB's President, the Duke of Westminster)
	London's Capital (1985/6)
	Guide Book of the Year Competition (during the 1980s)
	'It's not only Londoners who love London' (1992/3) – included training for frontline staff funded by CENTEC – precursor for Welcome Host in London.
	London – Be Part of It.
	Beyond London's West End.
	London Welcomes Visa (part of Focus London campaign).
	Take time to Discover the Thames (3 years from 1991).
	Sectoral campaigns – restaurants, shopping, theatre/arts etc.

PR and crisis management

While most of LTB's public relations activities were aimed at promoting the Capital, it also had to deal with a number of crises during the 1970s and 1980s, which had an impact not just on residents but on visitors to London.  Some of the many Provisional Irish Republican Army bombings affected tourist sites directly, here are just a few of the many incidents which killed and maimed Londoners and visitors.

	July 1974 Tower of London (a member of the LTB TIC staff was injured)
	March 1976 Daily Mail Ideal Home Exhibition
	March 1979 House of Commons (Airey Neave MP killed)
	April 1982 Baltic Exchange
	July 1982 Hyde Park and Regent's Park
	December 1983 Harrods (Christmas bombing)
	April 1993 Bishopsgate and St Ethelburga
List of terrorist incidents in London

Other incidents which affected tourism negatively included the high-jacking of the cruise ship Achille Lauro in the Mediterranean in October 1985 and the US bombing of Libya in April 1986.  LTB led a London PR group to co-ordinate media responses as many Americans cancelled trips to Europe.

London Visitor and Convention Bureau

The abolition of the Greater London Council in 1986 had been preceded by the withdrawal of funding from LTB by GLC (in 1983), as LTB was squeezed between the Margaret Thatcher Government and the left-wing GLC led by Ken Livingstone.  LTB relaunched itself as the London Visitor and Convention Bureau, relying extensively on commercial members' support, ETB contributions until public funding from the London Boroughs became available.

Silver Jubilee

In 1988, the London Tourist Board and Convention Bureau celebrated its Silver Jubilee; five prominent artists were invited to create original paintings celebrating London.  These were featured at an exhibition in Covent Garden and used for many years on posters promoting the capital.  The artists included Fred Cuming RA.

Consumer protection

From its early days LTB has championed the cause of the visitor in getting fair treatment from service providers – bureau de change, restaurants, street photographers, general price display etc. Some examples of where LTB was involved:
	Charter for Tourists (1975)
	Complaint handling – a way of monitoring visitor concerns.
	Price Marking Order 1978 --- street traders etc. had to display prices.
	Code of Conduct for Bureau de Change (1986) – made legal in 1992 by the Consumer Protection Act 1992.
	Restaurant Prices Code dealing with tipping and price display (1988)
	Price Indications (Resale of Tickets) Regulations 1994 – ticket agencies and touts required to show face value of tickets (this was a long campaign with SOLT etc.
	Code of Conduct for sightseeing tours
	Code for coach drivers (1988) e.g. only park in designated places, do not cause nuisance to local residents. (LTB produced the Coach Parking map for several years from 1986/7).

Research/statistics

From early on LTB has been involved in a range of research activities.  LTB took over the annual London Visitor survey from BTA in 1986 and produced an annual compendium of statistics for the industry and planners. The last London Visitor Survey coordinated by London & Partners was conducted in 2006 using a face-to-face methodology. Latest publicly available information from the London Visitor Survey (incl a series of profile questions such as nationality, age, purpose of visit and type and location of accommodation used ) are available on LTB's website.

Joint London Tourism Forum

The abolition of the GLC in 1986 was a significant event for London and for LTB. LTB took the prime role for developing and implementing strategic activity across a range of topics. The first Tourism Strategy for London was produced in 1987. This led to a whole range of activity. The headlines are as follows:

	Working with LPAC to undertake research into economic impact and into hotel development and securing tourism as a topic for all borough plans.
	The agreement of the need for more hotels in London – led to campaign for 10,000 more rooms by 2000 (achieved). First outer London site list produced in 1987.
	The securing of funding from Dept. of Employment for a Local Collaborative Project to develop training programmes for tourism in London. This led to setting up the London Tourism Manpower Project and Springboard which was opened in October 1990 by Michael Howard (it is now a national programme).
	A series of presentation to London boroughs and their growing involvement in tourism either individually or in sub-regional groups, e.g., Gateway London consisting of south east London boroughs
	An environment charter launched in 1989 and a litter charter in 1990.
	A campaign to secure longer term licences for boat operators which encourage them to invest in new boats – the PLA introduced five-year licences in 1991. Other river activity included training for boat crews and support for new piers.
	Securing of LBGC (London Boroughs Grant Scheme) funding – enabled LTB to undertake research, promote outer boroughs and participate in government funded local initiatives.
	Worked with Government City Action Team – secured funding for Southwark Heritage Assn in 1989, canal way marking, East End Tourism Trust and the Three Mills regeneration.
	Other activities included
	Islington TDAP (Discover Islington) supported by LTB from 1990
	Greenwich Strategic Development Initiative from 1991? – Woolwich Arsenal, Cutty Sark Gardens improvements etc.
	TourEast London – LTB secured SRB funding for 3 years from April 1995.
	Support for other programmes—Cross River Partnership, Pool of London Partnership, London's Waterways Partnership
	The new London brand launch in 1995 – themes: Heritage and Pageantry; Diversity, Friendly and Safe, Accessible; Arts/Culture and Entertainment.
	Securing funds from Department of National Heritage (later Department for Culture, Media and Sport-DCMS in 1995/6 for Focus London

LTB becomes Visit London 

In 2003, LTB became Visit London, a private company funded partly by partnership subscriptions and commercial activity. Its main funding (up to 70 per cent) came from the Mayor of London's London Development Agency.  Visit London built on LTB's success in the marketing and promotion of London.

Visit London's key activities included:
  Marketing: worldwide marketing campaigns
  Partnership: working with the tourism industry
  Travel trade: publications and trade shows
  Media relations : London news and images
  Digital: www.visitlondon.com
  Event solutions: a complete service for event organisers
  Events for London: a one stop shop for major events

London & Partners

On 1 April 2011, Mayor of London Boris Johnson launched London & Partners, a new promotional agency for the capital. London & Partners brings together the work of Visit London, Study London and Think London in attracting visitors, students and foreign direct investment to the capital. Visit London Ltd was wound up.

Presidents, Chairmen and Chief Executives of London Tourist Board and VisitLondon

Presidents
May 1963 – 1973 Lord Mancroft
1973 – Oct 1976 The Very Reverend Martin Sullivan Sir Anthony Milward
1980–1991 The Duke of Westminster
Dec 1991 – Dec 1997 Sir John Egan

Chairmen
May 1963 – 1965 Mr Charles Forte (Lord Forte)
1965 – October 1967 Mr Ben Russell
October 1967 -Nov 1970 Mr E C 'Tubbv' Garner
January 1971 – Summer 1971 Mr C D Hopkinson
Summer 1971 – October 1976 Sir Anthony Milward
October 1976 – March 1980 Lord Ponsonby of Shulbrede
April 1980 – March 1983 Mary Baker (now Lady Baker)
April 1983 – September 1983,John Hajdu (Acting chairman)
October 1983 – September 1989 Sir Christopher Leaver
October 1989 – January 1992 Dame Shelagh Roberts
January 1992 – July 1992 John Salisse (Acting chairman)
July 1992 – September 1993 Sir Hugh Bidwell
September 1993 – December 1997 Sir John Egan
January 1998 – December 2000 David Batts
December 2000 – March 2002 Teresa Wickham
July 2002– March 2011 Tamara Ingram
April 2011 – August 2013 Dame Judith Mayhew Jonas
September 2013 – present Kit Malthouse

Chief Executives

May 1963 – July 1970 John Howard Williams (general manager)
July 1970 – July 1981 Rodney Scrase
July 1981 – 1982 Geoffrey Smith OBE (Acting) (Director London Convention Bureau)
1982 – January 1984 Peter Stevens
January 1984 – February 1988 Graham Jackson
Feb 1988 – September 1994 Tom Webb
September 1994 – March 1996 Colin Hobbs
April 1996 – March 2003 Paul Hopper
2003 – 2005 David Campbell
2005 – 2008 James Bidwell
2008 – April 2011 Sally Chatterjee
April – May 2011 – Danny Lopez
June 2011 – present Gordon Innes

References

Tourism in London
Tourist Board
Local government in London
Government agencies established in 1963
1963 establishments in England
Tourism organisations in the United Kingdom
Tourism agencies